Aleksa "Aca" Stanojević (Knjaževac, Principality of Serbia, 1852 - SFR Yugoslavia, 1947) was a Serbian and Yugoslav politician, one of the founders and leaders of the People's Radical Party.

Stanojević was a member of the People's Radical Party since its founding in 1881. He was long-term Party MP, he also served as Speaker of the National Assembly of the Principality and later Kingdom of Serbia for several terms.

After the death of Nikola Pašić in 1926, he was elected chairman of the main committee and a new leader of the party. Although he was a loyalist to the Karađorđević dynasty, he opposed the establishment of the 6 January dictatorship in 1929 by King Alexander I.

At the end of World War II, he joined the KPJ-lead People's Front of Yugoslavia.

References

1852 births
1947 deaths
People from Knjaževac
People from the Principality of Serbia
People's Radical Party politicians
Members of the National Assembly (Serbia)